Collett is an unincorporated community in Pike Township, Jay County, Indiana.

History
Collett was platted in 1872, at the time the railroad was extended to that point. It was named for its founder, John Collett. A post office was established at Collett in 1872, and remained in operation until it was discontinued in 1922.

Geography

References

Unincorporated communities in Jay County, Indiana
Unincorporated communities in Indiana